All Day And All Of The Night Remixes is a 2005 EP released by Norwegian electronic band Flunk on Kriztal Entertainment. The title track is a cover of The Kinks' track "All Day And All Of The Night".

Track listing
"All Day And All Of The Night" (Original)
"I've Been Waiting All My Life To Leave You" (Elektrofant DX-7 Remix)
"Play" (Athome Project Remix)
"Play" (Slowpho Remix)
"All Day And All Of The Night" (Tronso & Nils Noa Remix)
"Morning Star" (Parliavox Remix)
"All Day And All Of The Night" (Tronso & Nils Noa Remix) - Radio Edit

2005 remix albums
Flunk albums
2005 EPs
Remix EPs